Walter Charles Murray (12 May 1866 – March 23, 1945) was the first President of the University of Saskatchewan.

Biography
Born in Kings County, New Brunswick, he received a Bachelor of Arts degree from the University of New Brunswick in 1886. In 1891, he received a Master of Arts degree from the University of Edinburgh. From 1892 to 1908, he was a professor at Dalhousie University.
From 1908 to 1937, he was the President of the University of Saskatchewan. The city of Saskatoon named "Murray Place" in the Dundonald area in Walter C. Murray's honor.

Legacy
Walter Murray Collegiate Institute, a high school in Saskatoon, Saskatchewan, Canada, was named after Walter Murray. Murray building in the University of Saskatchewan and President Murray Park in Saskatoon are named after him.

External links
Walter Murray: The Lengthened Shadow
President's Report, 1909

1866 births
1945 deaths
Presidents of the University of Saskatchewan